Carroll Chase (17 September 1878 – 11 May 1960) was an internationally recognized philatelic expert who specialized in classic stamps of the United States and France. In his effort to study classic French stamps, he traveled to France and remained there until 1941 when he returned to the United States.

Philatelic accomplishments
Chase was responsible for:
 complete plating of the U.S. three-cent 1851-57 issue
 plating of the French 25-centime 1871 issue
 co-author of The First Hundred Years of Territorial Postmarks 1787–1887 (1950)

Philatelic leadership
Chase was active in supporting philately. He:
 was vice-president of the American Philatelic Society in 1915–1917
 was president of the American Philatelic Society in 1920–1922
 signed the Roll of Distinguished Philatelists in 1921

Honors
Chase was internationally recognized and awarded a number of honors:
 Crawford Medal in 1930
 Lindenberg Medal in 1932
 Luff Award in 1944
 Lichtenstein Medal in 1954
 elected to the American Philatelic Society Hall of Fame in 1960

See also
 Philately
 Philatelic literature
 Lindenberg Medal

References and sources
References

Sources
 Carroll Chase

External links
 The  Summer of '59 with Dr. Carroll Chase
 Plating the 3c U.S. Imperforate Stamp of 1851 - 1857
 The 1¢ Franklin Plating
 Postage Stamps of the United States First Issued in 1847

1878 births
1960 deaths
Philatelic literature
American philatelists
Recipients of the Lindenberg Medal
Signatories to the Roll of Distinguished Philatelists
American Philatelic Society